Lindsay Graeme Foster was an Australian judge. He served as a Judge of the Federal Court of Australia from 4 September 2008 to 30 September 2020.

Foster studied at the University of Sydney and was admitted to practice by the Supreme Court of New South Wales in 1976. He practiced as a solicitor until his admission to the bar in 1981, and was appointed Senior Counsel in 1994. He continued to work as a barrister until his appointment to the Federal Court in September 2008, when he filled one of three open vacancies.

See also
List of Judges of the Federal Court of Australia

References 

20th-century births
2021 deaths
Judges of the Federal Court of Australia
Australian Senior Counsel
University of Sydney alumni
Judges of the Supreme Court of the Australian Capital Territory
21st-century Australian judges
Year of birth missing